The 1995 Amsterdam Admirals season was the inaugural season for the franchise in the World League of American Football (WLAF). The team was led by head coach Al Luginbill, and played its home games at Olympisch Stadion and De Meer Stadion in Amsterdam, Netherlands. They finished the regular season in first place with a record of nine wins and one loss. In World Bowl '95, Amsterdam lost to the Frankfurt Galaxy 26–22.

Offseason

World League draft

NFL allocations

Personnel

Staff

Roster

Schedule

Standings

Game summaries

Week 1: vs Barcelona Dragons

Week 2: vs Frankfurt Galaxy

Week 3: at London Monarchs

Week 4: at Scottish Claymores

Week 5: vs Rhein Fire

Week 6: at Barcelona Dragons

Week 7: vs Scottish Claymores

Week 8: at Frankfurt Galaxy

Week 9: vs London Monarchs

Week 10: at Rhein Fire

Notes

References

Amsterdam Admirals seasons